Nouvelle France (aka French North America) was a colonial possession of France in North America.

Nouvelle France or variant, may also refer to:

Historical topics
 Canada (New France), a French colony; the portion of Nouvelle France frequently meant by the term "Nouvelle France"
 Apostolic Vicariate of Nouvelle-France of the Roman Catholic Church in the colony of Canada
 Kingdom of Araucanía and Patagonia, South America; also called "Nouvelle France"
 Compagnie de la Nouvelle France, a French colonial syndicate with a monopoly on the fur trade in New France

Other uses
 Nouvelle-France (film), a 2004 historical romance film
 Nouvelle-France (soundtrack), a soundtrack album for the eponymous film
 Productions Nouvelle France, a Canadian record label
 Tour de la Nouvelle-France, a former pro-cycling stage race in Canada

See also

 Ma Nouvelle-France, the theme song for the 2004 film Nouvelle-France
 
 Nouvelle (disambiguation)
 France (disambiguation)
 New France (disambiguation)